The Quill is a program to write home computer adventure games. Written by Graeme Yeandle, it was published on the ZX Spectrum by Gilsoft in December 1983. Although available to the general public, it was used by several games companies to create best-selling titles; over 450 commercially published titles for the ZX Spectrum were written using The Quill.

Development 

Yeandle has stated that the inspiration for The Quill was an article in the August 1980 issue of Practical Computing by Ken Reed in which Reed described the use of a database to produce an adventure game. After Yeandle wrote one database-driven adventure game, Timeline, for Gilsoft, he realised that a database editor was needed, and it was this software which became The Quill.

After the original ZX Spectrum version was ported to the Amstrad CPC, Commodore 64, Atari 8-bit family, and Apple II and Oric.  Versions were also published by CodeWriter, Inc. in North America (under the name of AdventureWriter) and a version by Norace in Danish, Norwegian and Swedish. A French version was also made by Codewriter. In 1985 Neil Fleming-Smith ported The Quill to the BBC Micro and Acorn Electron computers for Gilsoft. Although not credited in the article, Chris Hobson submitted a patch to Crash magazine which allowed the Spectrum version to save to a Microdrive. This was published in the September 1986 edition

The Quill only allowed for the creation of text-only adventures, using a text interpretation process known as a verb–noun parser. Later an add-on called The Illustrator was made to let the user include graphics in the adventures. Further add-ons included The Press, The Patch, and The Expander, which enhanced the engine by adding text compression, split-screen text and graphics, and more efficient use of available RAM.

Critical reception 

The Quill was generally very well received by the computer press at the time of its release. Micro Adventurer described it as "a product [...] to revolutionise the whole microcomputer scene" and rated it "10 out of 10", while Computer and Video Games described it as "worth every penny of the £14.95 price tag", while CRASH said it was "almost ludicrously underpriced for what it does and, more importantly, what it allows others to do." Sinclair User were somewhat initially less enthusiastic, saying "no package, even if it is brilliant in the production of games using the sausage machine technique, will provide an answer to properly machine-coded and original games", although later in 1984 they said "The Quill produces programs on a par with handwritten commercial programs".

The Quill was awarded "Best Utility" in the CRASH Readers Awards 1984.

Sequel 

Following the success of the original, a second generation Quill was produced with more capabilities and sold under the name Professional Adventure Writer for the ZX Spectrum and CP/M range.

References

External links
 CASA: A Feather In His Cap - Graeme Yeandle and The Quill

 The Digital Antiquarian: The history of The Quill

1983 software
Commodore 64 software
Text adventure game engines
Video game development software
ZX Spectrum software